Esther Richman Saperstein (October 22, 1901 – May 17, 1988) was an American legislator, women's rights advocate and mental health activist.

Esther Richman Saperstein was born in Chicago, Illinois to Jewish immigrants, Ellis Richman from Russia and Mary Dresser from Poland. Saperstein went to Chicago public schools and Northwestern University. Saperstein was active in the Parent-Teacher Association. In 1955, Saperstein ran for the Chicago City Council and lost the election. Saperstein was a Democrat. In 1957, Saperstein served in the Illinois House of Representatives and served until 1967. Saperstein then served in the Illinois State Senate from 1967 until 1975 when she resigned from the Illinois General Assembly. In 1975, Saperstein was elected to the Chicago City Council and served until 1979. Saperstein died at her home in Chicago, Illinois.

Notes

Further reading

 S.v. "Saperstein, Esther Richman" in Schultz, Rima Lunin and Adele Hast, eds., Women Building Chicago 1790 - 1990: a Biographical Dictionary (Bloomington: Indiana University Press, 2001, pp. 778–80.

External links

1901 births
1988 deaths
Jewish women politicians
Northwestern University alumni
Women state legislators in Illinois
Chicago City Council members
Democratic Party Illinois state senators
Democratic Party members of the Illinois House of Representatives
Women city councillors in Illinois
20th-century American politicians
20th-century American women politicians
Jewish American state legislators in Illinois
20th-century American Jews
Jewish women activists